Rob Bowman (born 21 June 1956) is a Canadian Grammy Award-winning professor of ethnomusicology and a music writer.

Formerly the director of York University's Graduate Program in Ethnomusicology and Musicology in Toronto, he has written many liner notes, studies and books on popular music. He has been nominated six times for Grammy Awards.

Early life and education
Bowman was born and grew up in Toronto. He earned an Honours B.A. in musicology in 1978 at York University, and in 1982 completed an M.F.A. in ethnomusicology, also at York.  In 1983 he began his PhD studies at the University of Memphis, completing these in 1993.

Career
Bowman began writing for a music magazine in Toronto in 1971 at age 15.

In 1979 Bowman began teaching part-time at York University in Toronto, where he introduced the study of popular music. He also taught part-time at Brock University and George Brown College, beginning in 1987. In 1993 he became an assistant professor at York University; three-year later he served as an adjunct professor. By 1998 he was director of York's graduate music program.

Bowman studied the history of the Stax Records label and its artists; he created liner notes for boxed sets of The Complete Stax/Volt Soul Singles. In 2003 he wrote a book, Soulsville, U.S.A. – The Story of Stax Records, about the history of the Memphis-based record label.

Bowman won the 1996 Best Album Notes Grammy for his 47,000-word monograph accompanying the 10-CD boxed set of The Complete Stax/Volt Soul Singles, Vol. 3: 1972–1975. His fifth Grammy nomination came in 2002 for Best Album Notes for the 4-CD box set The Stax Story, which he also co-produced.

In the 2000s and 2010s Bowman created the programs for each year's Rock‘N’ Roll Hall of Fame induction ceremony, after interviewing the inductees.

Bowman was once again nominated for a Grammy award for his profile of the 1960s transgender R&B and soul singer Jackie Shane, which was included with the double album Any Other Way, a collection of her lesser-known recordings, which was nominated for a Grammy Award for Best Historical Album in 2019. He also co-produced the album.

Film
Bowman was one of many musical figures to appear in the 2005 Canadian country music mockumentary The Life and Hard Times of Guy Terrifico and in the 2010 documentary on singer-songwriter Ron Sexsmith, Love Shines. He also appeared in the 2017 CBC documentary film Dreaming of a Jewish Christmas.

Publications

Books
Soulsville, U.S.A. – The Story of Stax Records, Music Sales Group, 2003
The Flyer Vault – 150 Years of Toronto Concert History, Dundurn Press, 2019

Liner notes
The Complete Stax / Volt Soul Singles, Vol. 3: 1972–1975 : Various Artists : Concord Music Group, 2011
Any Other Way, Jackie Shane, 2017.
The Rolling Stones: Their Satanic Majesties Request (50th Anniversary) , Rolling Stones, 2017.

References

Date of birth missing (living people)
1957 births
Living people
Place of birth missing (living people)
Academic staff of York University
Canadian music academics
Canadian writers about music
Canadian music historians
Canadian male non-fiction writers
Musicians from Toronto
Writers from Toronto
Ethnomusicologists
Grammy Award winners